Enkelejda Shehu (born 23 January 1969) is an Albanian shooter who competed at the 1992 Summer Olympic Games and the 1996 Summer Olympic Games. She competed in the women's 10 metre air pistol event at the 2016 Summer Olympics for the United States. She lives in Naples, Florida and owns a Greek restaurant with her husband.

References

1969 births
Living people
Albanian female sport shooters
American female sport shooters
Shooters at the 1992 Summer Olympics
Shooters at the 1996 Summer Olympics
Shooters at the 2016 Summer Olympics
Olympic shooters of Albania
Olympic shooters of the United States
Place of birth missing (living people)
21st-century American women